This is a list of prime ministers defeated by either a parliamentary motion of no confidence or by the similar process of loss of supply.

Prime ministers defeated by votes of no confidence

Australia

Only one Australian prime minister, Malcolm Fraser, has ever been defeated in the House of Representatives by an explicit motion of no confidence. In addition, six prime ministers were unable to enact important policy and therefore resigned, two prime ministers were unable to obtain supply from the House of Representatives, one prime minister was unable to obtain supply in the Senate and was dismissed by the Governor General, one Prime Minister never had the confidence of the House of Representatives, lost a motion of no confidence and refused to resign.

These prime ministers were able to gain supply from the House of Representatives, but were unable to pass important policy-related legislation:

Chris Watson (1904, Conciliation and Arbitration Bill)
George Reid (1905, amendment on the address-in-reply)
Alfred Deakin (1908, motion to change the time of the next meeting of parliament)
Andrew Fisher (1909, a motion to adjourn debate)
Stanley Bruce (1929, major bill defeated)
James Scullin (1931, a motion to adjourn debate)

These prime ministers could not gain supply from the House of Representatives or an opposition amendment to a supply bill was passed:

Alfred Deakin (1904, could pass no legislation)
Arthur Fadden (1941, budget was amended down by £A1)
Malcolm Fraser (1975, could pass no legislation and lost a no confidence motion by the House of Representatives which also called on the Governor-General to recommission a government under Gough Whitlam as Prime Minister)

Gough Whitlam could not gain supply from the Senate which was controlled by the conservative Coalition. It thus precipitated the 1975 constitutional crisis and Whitlam was dismissed.

Following Whitlam's dismissal, Malcolm Fraser was appointed Prime Minister. He never had the confidence of the House of Representatives, and he lost a motion of no confidence by 10 votes in the House of Representatives two hours after the dismissal of Whitlam. However, the Governor-General refused to see the Speaker of the House of Representatives who was to convey this motion of no confidence to him, or to acknowledge the motion of no confidence of the House of Representatives which had also called on the Governor-General to recommission the government led by Gough Whitlam. One hour later the Governor-General dissolved parliament with Fraser still in office.

Austria
Sebastian Kurz (2019)

Barbados
Lloyd Erskine Sandiford (1994)

British Virgin Islands
Andrew Fahie (2022)(Premier)

Bulgaria
Philip Dimitrov (1992) – lost a vote of confidence
Kiril Petkov (2022)

Canada
All no confidences are minority governments.

Arthur Meighen (1926) – loss of confidence supply
John Diefenbaker (1963) – loss of confidence supply as a result of cabinet revolt
Pierre Trudeau (1974) – loss of confidence supply
Joe Clark (1979) – loss of confidence supply
Paul Martin (2005) – opposition triggered motion
Stephen Harper (2011) – opposition triggered motion as a result of contempt of Parliament. Though the motion passes, Harper ended up winning a majority government the following election.

Cook Islands
Terepai Maoate (2002)

Croatia
Tihomir Orešković (2016) – lost a vote of no confidence triggered by ruling party after he called for his vice-PM (ruling party president)'s resignation due to conflict of interest

Czech Republic
Mirek Topolánek (2006)
Mirek Topolánek (2009)
Jiří Rusnok (2013)
Andrej Babiš (2018)

Denmark
Knud Kristensen (1947)

Estonia
Mart Laar 1st (1994) (after breaching a contract with Russia by selling stock Russian rubles to secessionist Chechen Republic of Ichkeria)
Taavi Rõivas (2016) (after not leaving office when having lost parliamentary majority by coalition members leaving)

Finland
V. J. Sukselainen (1957)

France
Georges Pompidou (1962) – stayed on, National Assembly dissolved

Germany
Wilhelm Cuno (1923)
Gustav Stresemann (1923) – lost a vote of confidence
Hans Luther (1926)
Wilhelm Marx (1926)
Franz von Papen (1932)
Helmut Schmidt (1982)
Helmut Kohl (1982) – lost a vote of confidence (orchestrated by the majority with the aim of triggering an early federal election)
Gerhard Schröder (2005) – lost a vote of confidence (orchestrated by the majority with the aim of triggering an early federal election)

Haiti
Jacques-Édouard Alexis (2008)
Michèle Pierre-Louis (2009)

India
Vishwanath Pratap Singh (1990)
H. D. Deve Gowda (1997)
Atal Bihari Vajpayee (1999)

Ireland
Charles Haughey (1982)
Albert Reynolds (1992)

Israel
Yitzhak Shamir (1990)

Italy

Alfonso La Marmora 2nd (1865)
Federico Luigi Menabrea 1st (1867)
Giovanni Lanza (1873)
Benedetto Cairoli 1st (1878)
Agostino Depretis 3rd (1879)
Francesco Crispi 2nd (1891)
Antonio Di Rudinì 1st (1892)
Antonio Di Rudinì 3rd (1896)
Giuseppe Saracco (1901)
Alessandro Fortis 1st (1905)
Alessandro Fortis 2nd (1906)
Sidney Sonnino 1st (1906)
Paolo Boselli (1917)
Vittorio Emanuele Orlando (1919)
Luigi Facta (1922)
Benito Mussolini (1943)
Alcide De Gasperi 8th (1953)
Amintore Fanfani 1st (1954) 
Giulio Andreotti 1st (1972) 
Giulio Andreotti 5th (1979) 
Amintore Fanfani 7th (1987) 
Romano Prodi 1st (1998) 
Romano Prodi 2nd (2008)

Japan
Shigeru Yoshida 2nd (1948)
Shigeru Yoshida 4th (1953)
Masayoshi Ohira (1980)
Kiichi Miyazawa (1993)

Kazakhstan
Sergey Tereshchenko (1994)

Kosovo
Hashim Thaçi (2010)
Isa Mustafa (2017)
Albin Kurti (2020)

Libya
Ali Zeidan (2014)
Abdul Hamid Dbeibeh (2021)

Lithuania
Adolfas Šleževičius (1996)

Malta
Alfred Sant (1998)
Lawrence Gonzi (2012)

Marshall Islands
Casten Nemra (2016)

Moldova
Ion Sturza (1999)
Valeriu Streleț (2015)
Maia Sandu (2019)

Mongolia
Tsakhiagiin Elbegdorj (1998)

Montenegro
Zdravko Krivokapić (2022)
Dritan Abazović (2022)

Nepal
Sher Bahadur Deuba (1997)
Lokendra Bahadur Chand (1997)
KP Sharma Oli (2021)

Netherlands
Hendrikus Colijn (1939)
Jo Cals (1966)

New Zealand
Thomas MacKenzie (1912)

Niger
Hama Amadou (2007)

Northern Cyprus
İrsen Küçük (2013)

Norway
Christopher Hornsrud (1928)
Einar Gerhardsen (1963)
John Lyng (1963)
Kåre Willoch (1986) – lost a "cabinet question"
Jan Peder Syse (1990)
Kjell Magne Bondevik (2000) – lost a "cabinet question"

Pakistan
Imran Khan (2022)

Papua New Guinea
Michael Somare (1980)
Paias Wingti (1988)
Sam Abal (2011)

Peru
Fernando Zavala (2017)

Poland
Jan Olszewski (1992)
Hanna Suchocka (1993)
Waldemar Pawlak (1995) – (orchestrated by the majority with the aim of changing the prime minister without consent of the President Lech Walesa)
Marek Belka (2004) – lost a vote of confidence

Portugal
António Maria da Silva (1923)
José Domingues dos Santos (1925)
Mário Soares (1978, 1985)
Francisco Pinto Balsemão (1983)
Aníbal Cavaco Silva (1987)
Passos Coelho (Parliament rejected government programme) (2015)

Romania
Emil Boc (2009)
Mihai Răzvan Ungureanu (2012)
Sorin Grindeanu (2017)
Viorica Dăncilă (2019)
Ludovic Orban (2020)
Florin Cîțu (2021)

Slovakia
Vladimír Mečiar (1994)
Iveta Radičová (2011)
Eduard Heger (2022)

Slovenia
Lojze Peterle (1992)
Janez Drnovšek (2000)
Borut Pahor (2011)
Janez Janša (2013)

Solomon Islands
Manasseh Sogavare (2007, 2017)

Somalia
Ali Khalif Galaid (2001)
Ali Muhammad Ghedi (2004)
Abdi Farah Shirdon (Dec 2 2013)
Abdiweli Sheikh Ahmed (Dec 6 2014)

Spain
Mariano Rajoy (2018)

Sri Lanka
Mahinda Rajapaksa (Nov 14 2018)

Sweden
Ingvar Carlsson (1990)
Stefan Löfven (2018)
Stefan Löfven (2021)

Turkey
Kıbrıslı Mehmed Kâmil Pasha (1909)
Sadi Irmak (1974)
Bülent Ecevit (1977)
Tansu Çiller (1995)
Mesut Yılmaz (1996)

Tuvalu
Kamuta Latasi (1996)
Bikenibeu Paeniu (1999)
Faimalaga Luka (2001)
Saufatu Sopoanga (2004)
Maatia Toafa (2010)
Willy Telavi (2013)

Ukraine
Valeriy Pustovoitenko (1999) – lost a vote of confidence
Viktor Yushchenko (2001)
Viktor Yanukovych (2004)
Yulia Tymoshenko (2010)

United Kingdom

Lord North (1782)
John Russell, 1st Earl Russell (1866)
Benjamin Disraeli (1868)
William Ewart Gladstone (1885)
Robert Gascoyne-Cecil, 3rd Marquess of Salisbury (1886)
William Ewart Gladstone (1886)
Robert Gascoyne-Cecil, 3rd Marquess of Salisbury (1892)
Archibald Primrose, 5th Earl of Rosebery (1895)
Stanley Baldwin (January 1924)
Ramsay MacDonald (October 1924)
James Callaghan (1979)

Vanuatu
Maxime Carlot Korman (1996)
Barak Sopé (2001)
Serge Vohor (2004)
Edward Natapei (2010)
Sato Kilman (2011)

Western Sahara
Mahfoud Ali Beiba (1999)

Yugoslavia
Radoje Kontić (1998)

Other leaders defeated in no confidence votes

Presidents
These countries are generally parliamentary systems in which the president is elected by the parliament but is also head of state.

France
Adolphe Thiers (1873)

French Polynesia
Gaston Flosse (2005, 2008)
Oscar Temaru (2006, 2009)
Gaston Tong Sang (2007, 2011)

Guyana
David A. Granger (2018)

Kiribati
Teburoro Tito (2003)

Marshall Islands
Litokwa Tomeing (2009)

Nauru
Lagumot Harris (1996)
Bernard Dowiyogo (1996, 2001)
Kinza Clodumar (1998)
Ludwig Scotty (2003, 2007)
René Harris (2004)

Peru
Martín Vizcarra (2020)
Pedro Castillo (2022, see 2022 Peruvian self-coup attempt)

References

Notes

See also
Motion of Confidence#Examples of defeats by Motions of Confidence
Confidence and supply
List of impeachments of heads of state

Defeated by votes of no confidence